Large-scale Chinese immigration to Puerto Rico and the Caribbean began during the 19th century. Chinese immigrants had to face different obstacles that prohibited or restricted their entry in Puerto Rico.

When Puerto Rico was a Spanish colony, the Spanish government did encourage settlers of non-Hispanic origin. Although the Spanish government changed its policy with the passage of the Royal Decree of Graces (Real Cédula de Gracias) of 1815, the decree was intended to attract non-Hispanic Europeans who were willing to swear their allegiance to the Roman Catholic Church, not non-Christian Asians.

After Spain ceded Puerto Rico to the United States in accordance to the Treaty of Paris of 1898, Chinese immigrants were confronted with the United States' passage of the Chinese Exclusion Act (1882), which forbade the entry and immigration of Chinese nationals to the United States and its territories. After 1943, when the Chinese Exclusion Act was repealed and particularly in the 1950s, when hundreds of Cuban Chinese fled Cuba after Fidel Castro came to power, many more Chinese immigrants went to Puerto Rico.

There are about 1,757 people of Chinese descent in Puerto Rico, as per the 2018 U.S. Census estimates. This number could be higher, especially when taking into consideration those with partial Chinese ancestry, descending from multicultural Puerto Rican-Chinese families.

Spanish immigration restrictions

By the 19th century,  the Spanish Crown had lost most of its possessions in the Americas. Two of its remaining possessions were Puerto Rico and Cuba, which were demanding more autonomy and had pro-independence movements. The Spanish Crown issued the Royal Decree of Graces (Real Cédula de Gracias) which was originated August 10, 1815, with the intention of attracting Europeans of non-Spanish origin to the islands. The Spanish government, believing that the independence movements would lose their popularity, granted land and initially gave settlers "Letters of Domicile". The decree applied only to the people of Europe, since it was expected that the settlers would swear loyalty to the Spanish Crown and allegiance to the Roman Catholic Church.

In the early 1860s, José Julián Acosta, when commenting on Fray Íñigo Abbad y Lasierra's written history of Puerto Rico (which recorded events until the latter part of the 18th century), wrote a footnote in which he praises the local Spanish government for rejecting a proposal that would have allowed Chinese laborers to come to Puerto Rico from Trinidad and Tobago and Suriname. These restrictions were lifted in the latter part of the century.

During the latter part of the 19th century, Spain and the rest of the Americas became industrialized and were in need of manpower to fulfill their workforces. Poor and uneducated men, driven by war and starvation, made their way from China to the Americas as laborers. A large number of these unskilled workers were sold in what became known as the "coolie" trade. Puerto Rico, Cuba and the Dominican Republic were the last stop for many of the "coolies" before reaching their final destinations. Many of these Chinese immigrants stayed in Puerto Rico and the other two Caribbean countries.

20th century

When the United States enacted the Chinese Exclusion Act on May 6, 1882, many Chinese in the United States fled to Puerto Rico, Cuba and other Latin American nations. They established small niches and worked in restaurants and laundries. The Chinese Exclusion Act was a United States federal law which implemented the suspension of Chinese immigration. After the Spanish–American War, Spain ceded Puerto Rico to the United States under the conditions established by the Treaty of Paris of 1898. Chinese workers in the United States were allowed to travel to Puerto Rico. Some worked in the island's sugar industry, but most worked in re-building Puerto Rico's infrastructure and rail systems. Many of the workers in Puerto Rico decided to settle permanently in the island.

One of the reasons that the Chinese community in Puerto Rico did not flourish was because, in 1899, the War Department ordered the American officials in Puerto Rico to enforce the Chinese exclusion laws, as requested by the U.S. Secretary of the Treasury. They believed that Chinese agents were preparing to flood Puerto Rico with Chinese from other countries, who would eventually move on into the United States later. Although Chinese nationals were not allowed to go from Cuba to Puerto Rico, those who were in the United States were permitted to travel back and forth between the United States and Puerto Rico without restrictions. The Chinese Exclusion Act was repealed by the 1943 Magnuson Act, although large-scale Chinese immigration did not occur until the passage of the Immigration Act of 1965.

In 1959, thousands of business-minded Chinese fled Cuba, after the success of the Cuban Revolution led by Fidel Castro. One of the results of the communist revolution was that the state took over private property and nationalized all private-owned businesses. Most of the Cuban Chinese fled overseas and, among the places where many of them settled, were Puerto Rico, Miami and New York City.

Chinese influence in Puerto Rico
Chinese Puerto Ricans are involved in operating Chinese restaurants, and others work in other sectors. Many members of Puerto Rico's Chinese minority have integrated both Puerto Rican and Chinese cultures into their daily lives. Some Chinese have intermarried with Puerto Ricans and many of today's Chinese-Puerto Ricans have Hispanic surnames and are of mixed Chinese and Puerto Rican descent, e.g., Wu-Trujillo.

Various businesses are named Los Chinos (The Chinese) and a valley in Maunabo, Puerto Rico is called Quebrada Los Chinos (The Chinese Stream).  The Padmasambhava Buddhist Center, whose followers practice Tibetan Buddhism, has a branch in Puerto Rico.

Los Chinos de Ponce (English: "The Chinese from Ponce"), formally "King's [Ice] Cream", is an ice cream store whose owners are descendants of Chinese immigrants who arrived in Puerto Rico via Cuba in the early 1960s. The ice cream parlor, which is in front of the town square, Plaza Las Delicias, opposite the historic Parque de Bombas, opened in 1964. In addition, some well known Puerto Ricans have Asian ancestry, such as actor, singer and lawyer Raulito Carbonell (Raul Carbonell Huo, who has Chinese ancestry  on his mother's side)

Illegal immigration of Chinese nationals became a problem in Puerto Rico. On November 28, 2007, the United States Immigration and Customs Enforcement (ICE) announced that 15 citizens of the People's Republic of China were arrested and indicted for human smuggling. According to the indictment, the defendants participated in an alien smuggling organization operating out of the Dominican Republic and Puerto Rico. The organization was transporting, moving, concealing, harboring and shielding aliens. They arranged the transportation and moving of Chinese nationals from the Dominican Republic into the United States.

Common Chinese surnames
The following are Chinese surnames of Chinese who have immigrated to Puerto Rico:
 Chang
 Chin
 Joa
 Lao
 Lee
 Mas
 Wong
 Woo
 Wu
 Yan
 Yon

See also

 List of Puerto Ricans
Cultural diversity in Puerto Rico
 Overseas Chinese
 Chinatowns in Latin America
 Chinatowns in the United States

References

19th-century establishments in Puerto Rico
Asian Puerto Rican
Chinese Caribbean
Chinese
Immigration to Puerto Rico
Social history of Puerto Rico
Puerto Rican
Chinese emigration